Van Grinsven is a surname. Notable people with the surname include:

 Chatilla van Grinsven (born 1991), Dutch basketball player
 Jan van Grinsven (born 1960), Dutch footballer

See also
 Van Grunsven